Cyrtognatha is a genus of long-jawed orb-weavers that was first described by Eugen von Keyserling in 1881. It is a senior synonym of Agriognatha.

Species
 it contains twenty-one species, found in the Caribbean, South America, Guatemala, Costa Rica, Mexico, and Panama:
Cyrtognatha atopica Dimitrov & Hormiga, 2009 – Argentina
Cyrtognatha bella (O. Pickard-Cambridge, 1896) – Costa Rica
Cyrtognatha bryantae (Chickering, 1956) – Jamaica
Cyrtognatha catia Dimitrov & Hormiga, 2009 – Colombia
Cyrtognatha eberhardi Dimitrov & Hormiga, 2009 – Brazil
Cyrtognatha espanola (Bryant, 1945) – Hispaniola
Cyrtognatha insolita (Chickering, 1956) – Costa Rica, Panama
Cyrtognatha lepida (O. Pickard-Cambridge, 1889) – Panama
Cyrtognatha leviorum Dimitrov & Hormiga, 2009 – Panama
Cyrtognatha morona Dimitrov & Hormiga, 2009 – Ecuador
Cyrtognatha nigrovittata Keyserling, 1881 (type) – Peru
Cyrtognatha orphana Dimitrov & Hormiga, 2009 – Brazil
Cyrtognatha pachygnathoides (O. Pickard-Cambridge, 1894) – Costa Rica, Panama
Cyrtognatha paradoxa Dimitrov & Hormiga, 2009 – Mexico
Cyrtognatha pathetica Dimitrov & Hormiga, 2009 – Guatemala
Cyrtognatha petila Dimitrov & Hormiga, 2009 – Mexico
Cyrtognatha quichua Dimitrov & Hormiga, 2009 – Ecuador
Cyrtognatha rucilla (Bryant, 1945) – Hispaniola
Cyrtognatha serrata Simon, 1898 – Martinique, St. Vincent
Cyrtognatha simoni (Bryant, 1940) – Cuba
Cyrtognatha waorani Dimitrov & Hormiga, 2009 – Ecuador

In synonymy:
C. argyra (Bryant, 1945) = Cyrtognatha rucilla (Bryant, 1945)

See also
 List of Tetragnathidae species

References

Araneomorphae genera
Spiders of Central America
Spiders of Mexico
Spiders of South America
Spiders of the Caribbean
Taxa named by Eugen von Keyserling
Tetragnathidae